The Sopwith Sparrow was a manned light aircraft developed from the Sopwith A.T. (Aerial Target) drone and was powered by a  ABC Gnat engine.

References

Sparrow
Biplanes